Ecolines is a long distance European coach company with a transnational network.

History 
Ecolines connects 170 destinations, covering the whole of Europe, with priority given to Central and Eastern Europe. It was founded in Riga, Latvia in 1993 as Norma-A. Ecolines in its current form is an amalgamation of various European bus companies. In the Baltic states Ecolines was the first coach operator to implement a multimodal transportation system. The company operates the most extensive route network in the Baltic states.

Operating companies 
 Amron (Russia)
 Avtobus-Tur (Belarus)
 Ecolines Estonia (Estonia)
 Norma-A (Latvia)
 TRANSINESTA (Lithuania)
 AutoLux (Ukraine)

External links 
 

Bus operating companies
International bus transport in Europe
Companies based in Riga
1993 establishments in Latvia